Gao Ning (born 11 October 1982) is a retired Chinese-born Singaporean table tennis player. He is considered Singapore's best male player with a world ranking of 34 as of August 2016. He was first in men's singles at the 2007 Commonwealth Table Tennis Championships. In 2018, Gao won the men's singles as well as the mixed doubles at the Commonwealth Games along with Yu Mengyu.

He won a gold medal as a team member plus silver medals in the men's singles and men's doubles at the 2010 Commonwealth Games in Delhi.

Gao Ning cried after his singles match defeat to an opponent in the Beijing 2008 Olympics as no coach was available to guide him during the match. His coach was sick before the match. The scene of him in tears was telecast on local TV, causing the head coach of the Singapore table tennis team to lose his job.

At the 2014 Commonwealth Games, he won another two gold medals and a silver. The gold medals came in the men's doubles, with Li Hu, and the men's team, again with Li, and Zhan Jian. The silver came in the men's individual, where he lost the final to his teammate Zhan.

Career records
Singles (as of 22 April 2015)
 Olympics: round of 16 (2012).
 World Championships: round of 16 (2007, 2013).
 World Cup appearances: 3. Record: 5-8th (2007).
 ITTF World Tour winner (2): India Open 2007; Chile Open 2012. Runner-up (1): Brazil Open 2007.
 ITTF World Tour Grand Finals appearances: 4. Record: SF (2011).
 Asian Games: QF (2010).
 Asian Championships: round of 16 (2007, 2009).
 Asian Cup: 1st (2007); 2nd (2010); 3rd (2008).

Men's doubles
 World Championships: QF (2009).
 Pro Tour winner (6): India, Austrian Open 2007; Chile Open 2008; India Open 2009; Kuwait Open 2012; UAE 2013. Runner-up (10): Russian, German Open 2006; Brazil, Chile, Korea, Chinese Taipei, German, Swedish Open 2007; Polish Open 2008; India Open 2010.
 Pro Tour Grand Finals appearances: 6. Record: winner (2008, 2012); runner-up (2009, 2010).
 Asian Championships: winner (2012); SF (2013).

Mixed doubles
 World Championships: round of 16 (2009, 2011).

Team
 Olympics: 5th (2012).
 World Championships: 5th (2014).
 Commonwealth Games: winner (2010).

References

External links
 

1982 births
Living people
People from Xinji
Table tennis players from Hebei
Chinese emigrants to Singapore
Singaporean sportspeople of Chinese descent
Naturalised citizens of Singapore
Naturalised table tennis players
Chinese male table tennis players
Singaporean male table tennis players
Commonwealth Games gold medallists for Singapore
Commonwealth Games silver medallists for Singapore
Table tennis players at the 2010 Commonwealth Games
Olympic table tennis players of Singapore
Table tennis players at the 2008 Summer Olympics
Table tennis players at the 2012 Summer Olympics
Table tennis players at the 2016 Summer Olympics
Asian Games medalists in table tennis
Table tennis players at the 2006 Asian Games
Table tennis players at the 2010 Asian Games
Table tennis players at the 2014 Asian Games
Table tennis players at the 2018 Asian Games
Table tennis players at the 2014 Commonwealth Games
Asian Games bronze medalists for Singapore
Commonwealth Games medallists in table tennis
Medalists at the 2014 Asian Games
Table tennis players at the 2018 Commonwealth Games
Southeast Asian Games medalists in table tennis
Southeast Asian Games gold medalists for Singapore
Southeast Asian Games silver medalists for Singapore
Southeast Asian Games bronze medalists for Singapore
Competitors at the 2007 Southeast Asian Games
Competitors at the 2009 Southeast Asian Games
Competitors at the 2011 Southeast Asian Games
Competitors at the 2015 Southeast Asian Games
Competitors at the 2017 Southeast Asian Games
Medallists at the 2010 Commonwealth Games
Medallists at the 2014 Commonwealth Games
Medallists at the 2018 Commonwealth Games